The Charles Dowler House is an historic house at 581 Smith Street in Providence, Rhode Island.   It is a -story mansard-roofed wood-frame structure, built in 1872 by Charles Parker Dowler, a local artist.  The building typifies a cottage ornée, or decorated cottage, a building style popular in the 1860s and 1870s.  It is an elaborately decorated Second Empire structure, with an asymmetrical T layout, detailed decoration in the dormers which pierce the fish-scale-shingled mansard roof, and a porch in the crook of the T which is supported by Corinthian columns.  The interior retains both extensive period woodwork and wall paintings.

The house was listed on the National Register of Historic Places in 1984.

See also
National Register of Historic Places listings in Providence, Rhode Island

References

Houses completed in 1877
Houses on the National Register of Historic Places in Rhode Island
Houses in Providence, Rhode Island
National Register of Historic Places in Providence, Rhode Island
1877 establishments in Rhode Island